Jin Kyung-Sun (born April 10, 1980) is a South Korean retired football player.

His previous club is Jeonbuk Hyundai Motors, Daegu FC, Bucheon SK and Ulsan Hyundai Mipo Dolphin in Korea National League.

Club career 
2003 Bucheon SK
2004-2005 Ulsan Hyundai Mipo Dolphin
2006-2008 Daegu FC
2009–2012 Jeonbuk Hyundai Motors
2013–Present Gangwon FC

External links
 

1980 births
Living people
Association football midfielders
South Korean footballers
Jeju United FC players
Daegu FC players
Jeonbuk Hyundai Motors players
Gangwon FC players
Gyeongnam FC players
K League 1 players
K League 2 players
Ajou University alumni